Cosmosoma durca is a moth of the family Erebidae. It was described by William Schaus in 1896. It is found in São Paulo, Brazil.

References

durca
Moths described in 1896